The Victoria Cross (VC) was awarded to 111 members of the British Armed Forces during the Crimean War (also known as the Russian War) that lasted from 1854 to 1856. The Victoria Cross is a military decoration awarded for valour "in the face of the enemy" to members of armed forces of some Commonwealth countries and previous British Empire territories. The VC was introduced in Great Britain on 29 January 1856 by Queen Victoria to reward acts of valour during the Crimean War. It takes precedence over all other Orders, decorations and medals; it may be awarded to a person of any rank in any service and to civilians under military command. The first ceremony was held on 26 June 1857 where Queen Victoria invested 62 of the 111 Crimean recipients in Hyde Park.

In 1854, the Crimean War broke out between the Russian Empire and an alliance of France, Great Britain, the Kingdom of Sardinia and the Ottoman Empire. One of the first battles of the War was the Battle of the Alma where allied forces convincingly defeated the Russian forces. The Siege of Sevastapol followed shortly after in September 1854; it was to last for a year at the cost of over 128,000 lives, three-quarters of which died from disease. After the siege at Sevastapol, the fighting mainly ceased and on 30 March 1856, after two years of action, the Russians negotiated a Peace Treaty at the Congress of Paris. The Treaty set the Black Sea as neutral territory, closing it to all warships, and prohibiting fortifications and the presence of armaments on its shores. The Crimean War led to a number of large-scale changes in the British Army. The sale of commissions came under great scrutiny during the war, especially in connection with the Battle of Balaclava, which saw the ill-fated Charge of the Light Brigade. This scrutiny eventually led to the abolition of the sale of commissions.

The dispatches of William Howard Russell during the war highlighted how many acts of bravery and valour by British servicemen went unrewarded. There was a growing feeling amongst the public and in the Royal Court that a new award was needed to recognise incidents of gallantry that were unconnected with a man's lengthy or meritorious service. Queen Victoria issued a warrant under the Royal sign-manual on 29 January 1856 (gazetted 5 February 1856) that officially constituted the VC. The order was backdated to 1854 to recognise acts of valour during the Crimean War. The first awards ceremony was held on 26 June 1857 where Queen Victoria invested 62 of the 111 Crimean recipients in a ceremony in Hyde Park.

Citations for the Crimean War, particularly those in the first gazette of 24 February 1857, listed multiple actions for about a third of the recipients. The format of each citation varied between recipients, some specify the actual date, some the name of the battle and others have both sets of information.

Until 1907, it was policy not to award the VC posthumously. Between 1857 and 1901, nine notices were published in the London Gazette for soldiers who would have been awarded the VC had they survived. In a partial reversal of policy in 1902, medals were sent to the next of kin of the three mentioned for the Boer War and at the same time the first three official posthumous awards, again for the Boer War, were gazetted. In 1907, the posthumous policy was completely reversed and medals were sent to the next of kin of the remaining six officers and men. As a result of the change of policy, one quarter of all awards for the First World War were posthumous but it was only in the general revision of the warrant issued in 1920 that a clause was inserted to explicitly allow posthumous awards.

Recipients

References 
General
 
 
 

Specific

Crimean War